Galilee is an unincorporated community in Wayne County, in the U.S. state of Pennsylvania.

History
The Galilee Post Office opened on August 3, 1848, and closed on December 30, 1966. The community was named after the ancient city of Galilee.

References

Unincorporated communities in Wayne County, Pennsylvania
Unincorporated communities in Pennsylvania